Talinoc i Jerlive is a village in Ferizaj municipality, Kosovo.

Notes

References 

Villages in Ferizaj